Dřevohostice is a market town in Přerov District in the Olomouc Region of the Czech Republic. It has about 1,500 inhabitants.

Geography
It lies in the Moravian-Silesian Foothills. It is situated at the confluence of the streams Moštěnka and Bystřička.

History

The first written mention of Dřevohostice is from 1326. From 1368, it was referred to as a market town. From the 15th century, it was owned by the Zierotin family.

Culture
Two cultural events are held in the castle gardens of the Dřevohostice Castle every year. Dřevorockfest is an open-air festival of rock music where mainly Czech bands gather. This festival has been held since 2005.

The second annual event is Setkání dechových hudeb (Gathering of Brass Bands). This event usually involves multiple bands especially from Haná and Moravian Slovakia regions. The festival was held for the first time in 1994.

Sights
The main landmark of Dřevohostice is the Dřevohostice Castle. It is a Rennaisance four-winged castle built in 1595–1617. It was created by reconstruction of an old water fortress from the 14th century. Since 2002, it has been serving the cultural and social needs of the market town, and it also houses the exhibition of the sculptor Jiří Lender, the memorial hall of Cardinal Lev Skrbenský z Hříště and the museum of firefighting equipment.

A cultural monument is the Church of Saint Gall, built in the late Baroque style in the second half of the 18th century.

Twin towns – sister cities

Dřevohostice is twinned with:
 Turawa, Poland

References

External links

Populated places in Přerov District
Market towns in the Czech Republic